Walking a Tightrope is a 1991 French drama film written and directed by Nikos Papatakis. It was screened in competition at the 48th Venice International Film Festival.

Cast 
 Michel Piccoli as Marcel Spadice
 Lilah Dadi as Franz-Ali Aoussine
 Polly Walker as Hélène Lagache
 Patrick Mille as Fredy Babitchev
 Juliette Degenne as Jacqueline Masset 
 Doris Kunstmann as Christa Paeffgen Aoussine
 Bernard Farcy as The Policeman

References

External links

1991 films
1991 drama films
1991 LGBT-related films
French drama films
French LGBT-related films
Circus films
LGBT-related drama films
1990s French films